Louis George Mylne (1843 – 1921) was the Bishop of Bombay from 1876 until 1897.

Career
Born into a colonial family, Mylne was educated at Merchiston Castle School, Edinburgh and  Corpus Christi College, Oxford before being ordained in 1867. After a curacy in North Moreton  he became a Tutor at Keble College, Oxford before elevation to the episcopate. After 21 years he returned to the United Kingdom, taking incumbencies in Alvechurch and Marlborough. His The Times obituary noted that although he "belonged to the older school of high churchmen, he was able to work harmoniously with men within and without the Church whose opinions did not agree with his own”

Works
A prolific author, his works include:
"English Church Life in India", 1881
"Corporate Life of the Church in India", 1884
"Counsels and Principles of the Lambeth Conference of 1888", 1889
"Sermons preached in Bombay", 1889
"Churchmen and the Higher Criticism", 1893
"Hopes for Reunion", 1896
"The Hidden Riches of Secret Places (in Mankind and the Church)", 1907
"Mission to Hindus", 1908
"The Holy Trinity", 1916

Family
Mylene married at St. Thomas Cathedral, Bombay, on 27 December 1880, Amy Frederica Moultrie, daughter of G. W. Moultrie, Agent of the Bank of Bengal in Bombay.

References

1843 births
People educated at Merchiston Castle School
Alumni of Corpus Christi College, Oxford
Anglican bishops of Bombay
19th-century Anglican bishops in Asia
1921 deaths
British people in colonial India